Polymerus testaceipes is a species of plant bug in the family Miridae. It is found in the Caribbean Sea, Central America, North America, and South America.

References

Further reading

 

Articles created by Qbugbot
Insects described in 1860
Polymerus